Bruce Alan Heyman (born 1958) is an American businessman and a former United States Ambassador to Canada. He was confirmed by the U.S. Senate on March 12, 2014. He presented his credentials to the Governor General of Canada, and began his duties in Ottawa, on April 8, 2014. His tenure ended on January 20, 2017.

Early life and education
Heyman was born in Elmira, New York to a Jewish family and raised in Dayton, Ohio. Heyman graduated from the Miami Valley School, and received a B.A. (1979) and an M.B.A. (1980) from Vanderbilt University.

His grandfather, Sam Malamud, immigrated from Lithuania in 1912. He followed in the footsteps of his older brother Ben, and assumed the surname of his cousin, Henry Heyman.

In 1977 and 1978, Heyman interned at the U.S. House of Representatives for Congressman Charles Whalen of Ohio. In the summer of 1979, Heyman was a researcher for the Small Business Committee and Restraint of Trade Subcommittee.

Career
In 1980, Heyman worked as a Chicago-based investment banker for Goldman Sachs. From 1985 to 1999, Heyman served as a Vice President of Goldman Sachs. From 1999 to 2014, he served as a managing director of private wealth management at Goldman Sachs.

Prior to becoming Ambassador, Heyman served as a board member for the Chicago Council on Global Affairs and the Northwestern Memorial Hospital Foundation. He also served as an advisor to the Fix the Debt CEO Council of the Committee for a Responsible Federal Budget. He has been a member of The Economic Club of Chicago, The Executives' Club of Chicago, and the Facing History and Ourselves Chicago Advisory Board.

Heyman and his wife hosted an Obama fundraiser in 2007 in their home. In 2012, the Heymans both served on Obama’s National Finance Committee, and together they collected and contributed $1.7 million to his reelection bid.

On September 19, 2013, President Barack Obama nominated Heyman to be the U.S. Ambassador to Canada. Heyman was confirmed by the U.S. Senate on March 12, 2014. He replaced Ambassador David Jacobson. As the U.S. Ambassador to Canada, Heyman became a member of the Fulbright Canada Board of Directors. In 2014 and 2016, Heyman was named one of the Top 50 Most Powerful Business People by Canadian Business.

In 2015, Heyman gave the keynote address at Niagara University's commencement ceremony. At the ceremony, Heyman was presented an honorary Doctor of Humane Letters.

In January 2017, he announced that he was stepping down as the U.S. Ambassador to Canada. He was replaced by Ambassador Kelly Craft.

Political activities
Heyman and his wife have been prominent donors to President Obama since 2007 and have been some of his top fundraisers. In 2012, both he and his wife served on Obama's National Finance Committee tasked with raising funds for Obama's re-election campaign.

Personal life
He is married to Vanderbilt then-classmate Vicki Simons who is also Jewish. The two married on June 15, 1980 in Ashland, Kentucky. They have three children: David, Liza, and Caroline, as well as three grandchildren.

His wife served on the executive board of the Center for Jewish Life at Vanderbilt University and the foundation board of the Children's Memorial Hospital in Chicago.

The Heymans are members of the Reform Judaism Temple Shalom of Chicago.

References

1958 births
Living people
Ambassadors of the United States to Canada
American investment bankers
Jewish American bankers
Businesspeople from Chicago
Goldman Sachs people
Illinois Democrats
Businesspeople from Dayton, Ohio
Vanderbilt University alumni
People from Elmira, New York